Vysokovo is a rural locality (a village) in Vtorovskoye Rural Settlement, Kameshkovsky District, Vladimir Oblast, Russia. The population was 52 as of 2010.

Geography 
Vysokovo is located 13 km southwest of Kameshkovo (the district's administrative centre) by road. Kunitsyno is the nearest rural locality.

References 

Rural localities in Kameshkovsky District